Siderno ( or) is a town and comune  in  the Metropolitan City of Reggio Calabria, Calabria, southern Italy, about 3 kilometres from Locri. 

Siderno Marina is the newer town located on the Ionian coast. It is a destination for both Italian and foreign tourists and has a bathing beach.

Siderno Superiore is the old town, higher up on the flank of the coastal mountain range. It has historic palaces, old buildings and very narrow streets. Its population has largely relocated to the Marina which offers more job opportunities and services.

History
The early history of the town is unknown. The old town in the hilly inland was probably founded in the 10th century by some people from Locri, who had fled to the area to defend themselves from Saracen incursions; in the following century it became a hamlet of the county of Grotteria and was home to various feudal lords. Siderno Marina was built along the coast after the 1783 earthquake.

Emigration
Large-scale emigration abroad as well as to Northern Italy, which began to diminish only in the 1970s, has had a lasting effect on the demographic situation in the region. Emigrants from Siderno immigrated to the United States, Canada and Australia since the end of the 19th century to find employment.

Many moved to Canada settled in Schreiber, Ontario due to then-ongoing construction of the Canadian Pacific Railway. One of them was Cosimo Figliomeni. His good fortune and letters home lured many of his villagers to jobs in Schreiber. Half of Schreiber's 2,000 residents trace their roots to Siderno.

Economy
Siderno  is a  tourist resort  on the Ionian coast of the province of Reggio Calabria, with wide, sandy beaches, and a clear sea .

The Siderno area is a center of production of bergamot orange, a citrus fruit that is used as an essence and fundamental ingredient in cosmetics, for its wound healing properties in the pharmaceutical industry, and for flavouring in the food industry.

Crime

The town is home to the 'Ndrangheta, a Mafia-type criminal organization based in Calabria. Several powerful criminal clans originate from the town. Siderno was the fiefdom of Antonio Macrì, the undisputed local boss until his demise in January 1975. Several of the criminal clans are sometimes involved in bloody feuds. The town is home to one of the 'Ndrangheta's biggest and most important clans, the Commisso 'ndrina, heavily involved in the global cocaine business and money laundering.

Several clans moved to Canada, in particular the Greater Toronto Area, home to what Canadian law enforcement call the Siderno Group, which has been here since at least the 1950s. "The criminal minds of Siderno are in Canada", according to the Siderno police force. One of them, Antonio Commisso, was arrested in June 2005. Individuals related to the so-called Siderno Group were still active in Southern Ontario in 2018.

People
 Antonio Commisso (born 1956), 'Ndrangheta boss
 Antonio Macrì (1902–1975), historical 'Ndrangheta boss
 Francesco Panetta (born 1963), former long-distance runner
 Nicola Zitara (born 1927), historian
 Leon Panetta (born 1938) – who served in the Obama administration as Director of the Central Intelligence Agency from 2009 to 2011, and as Secretary of Defense from 2011 to 2013, as well as Chief of Staff in the Clinton administration from 1994 to 1997 –, is issued from a family native from Siderno. He was responsible for the operation that led to the Death of Osama bin Laden, the leader and founder of al-Qaeda and the mastermind of the 9/11 attacks
'Ndrangheta, Italy's most powerful organized crime syndicate has their roots in Siderno, and continue to use this city as a base of operations.

Twin cities
 Thunder Bay, Canada

Frazioni
Donisi, Vennerello, Mirto, Campo, Lucis, Zammariti, Pellegrina, Arona, San Filippo, Leone, Grappidaro, Gonia, Pergola, Lamia.

References

 Gratteri, Nicola & Antonio Nicaso (2006). Fratelli di Sangue, Cosenza: Luigi Pellegrini Editore

External links
 Italian Wikipedia article on Siderno